Armenia selected their Junior Eurovision Song Contest 2008 entry by a national final with two quarter-finals, one semi-final and a final. The winner was Monika Manchuarova with "Im Ergy Hnchyune", which represented Armenia in the Junior Eurovision Song Contest 2008 on 22 November 2008.

Before Junior Eurovision

National final 
A submission period for artists was held until 5 May 2008. 200 applications were received, and 36 entries were chosen for the national final.

Quarter-final 1 
The first quarter-final was held on 30 June 2008, hosted by Felix and Emmy. Eighteen songs competed and an "expert" jury chose 10 songs to qualify for the semi-final.

Quarter-final 2 
The second quarter-final was held on 1 July 2008, hosted by Felix and Emmy. Eighteen songs competed and an "expert" jury chose 10 songs to qualify for the semi-final.

Semi-final 
The semi-final was held on 6 July 2008, hosted by Felix and Emmy. The eighteen songs which qualified from the two quarter-finals competed and an "expert" jury chose 10 songs to qualify for the final.

Final 
The final was held on 11 July 2008, hosted by Felix and Emmy. The ten songs which qualified from the two quarter-finals competed and the winner was chosen by a combination of televoting and the votes from an "expert" jury.

At Junior Eurovision 

Since the song was performed in the national final, the lyrics have been changed, as well as the melody. The song title was changed from "Im Ergy Hnchuny" to "Im Ergy Hnchyune". Armenia was drawn to perform in spot two. As well as the singer on stage, like in the national final, there were two dancers and two backing singers; one of them was the songwriter. The animation on the screen behind them also appeared in the preview video. The song placed in the 8th position with 59 points, which were received from Belgium, Netherlands, Cyprus, Romania, Russia, Ukraine, Belarus, Bulgaria and Georgia.

Voting

Notes

References

External links 
 Official Armenian Junior Eurovision Site of 2008

Junior Eurovision Song Contest
Armenia
2008